The initialism SAD may refer to:

Medicine
 Sagittal abdominal diameter, body diameter at the waistline
 Schizoaffective disorder, a psychiatric diagnosis
 Seasonal affective disorder, typically winter depression
 Separation anxiety disorder in children
 Social anxiety disorder

Organisations
 Shiromani Akali Dal, a political party in India
 , a type of incorporated sports club in Spain
 , a type of incorporated sports club in Portugal
 Special Activities Division, of the US Central Intelligence Agency, later Special Activities Center
Saraya Awliya al-Dam, an Iraqi militia

Science and technology
 Selected area diffraction, a crystallographic experimental technique
 Single-wavelength anomalous dispersion, in X-ray crystallography
 Sum of absolute differences in digital image processing

Other uses
 Single Administrative Document, EU customs form
 Singles Awareness Day, a humorous holiday every February 14
 Suicide Attack Database, for 1982-2013
 "S.A.D.", a song by Man Overboard on the album Heart Attack
 Safford Regional Airport, Arizona, US, IATA airport code
 Standard American Diet

See also
 Sad (disambiguation)